Born on Flag Day is the second album by American indie-rock band Deer Tick.

Track listing

References

External links
 Official Website
 Deer Tick @ Partisan Records
 MySpace

2009 albums
Deer Tick (band) albums
Partisan Records albums